The Citadel Bulldogs women's soccer is an intercollegiate varsity sports team of The Citadel.  The team is a member of the Southern Conference of the National Collegiate Athletic Association, and was established in 2001 shortly after the integration of women into the South Carolina Corps of Cadets.  The men's soccer program was discontinued in 2004.

Head coaches
The table below shows the Bulldogs head coaches and their records through the 2021 season.

All-time results
The table below shows the Bulldogs record for all seasons through 2021.

References